County Road 663 is a two-lane highway which runs between Moen in Fræna and Mjølkestølen in Eide, in Møre og Romsdal, Norway. At both termini it has an intersection with County Road 64. Part of the road has been designated as one of eighteen National Tourist Routes in Norway.

References

663
663
National Tourist Routes in Norway